Nagi Abdalla El-Tomi (born 21 October 1977) is a Libyan futsal player.

He played for the Libya national futsal team at the 2008 FIFA Futsal World Cup in Brazil. El-Tomi made three appearances in the tournament, where Libya were eliminated in the group stage, against Uruguay, Spain, and Iran.

Honors
 African Futsal Championship:
 2008
 Arab Futsal Championship:
 2007, 2008

References

1977 births
Living people
Libyan men's futsal players